Andrew Ives is a British automotive engineer.

He is a graduate of Brunel University with a First Class Honours in Electrical and Electronic Engineering, and of INSEAD.

He is a Fellow of the Institution of Engineering Technology.

He worked for Lucas Industries for thirty years.
He worked with Jaguar Racing.
He oversaw the development of engine electronics for the Metro 6R4 super rally car.
He was Principal Consultant to Saturn Electronics and Engineering Inc.

References

Living people
Year of birth missing (living people)
Alumni of Brunel University London
INSEAD alumni
Fellows of the Institution of Mechanical Engineers